Brian Glendinning (born 26 December 1934) is an English former footballer who played in the Football League for Darlington. A centre forward, he went on to play non-league football for South Shields.

References

1934 births
Living people
Footballers from Newcastle upon Tyne
English footballers
Association football forwards
Darlington F.C. players
South Shields F.C. (1936) players
English Football League players